The Museums Computer Group (MCG) is a British group which provides a forum for discussion between museum, gallery, archive, and higher education professionals who work with computers and new technologies.

Overview
The group meets at different museums throughout the United Kingdom. The organization is run by a committee with a chair, secretary and treasurer.

The MCG provides a forum for debate and a source of practical help through the possibilities it provides.

UK Museums on the Web
The MCG organizes the annual United Kingdom Museums on the Web conference, aimed at museum website managers and those working with web content in museums.

See also 
 Collections Trust
 Culture24
 Museum Computer Network, USA
 Museum informatics

References

External links 
 MCG website
 Email list
 Jodi Award

Museum organizations
Information technology organisations based in the United Kingdom
Museums Computer Group
Museum informatics